Boves may refer to:

 Boves, Piedmont, a municipality in the Province of Cuneo, Piedmont, Italy
 Boves, Somme, a commune in the Somme department, Hauts-de-France, France
 José Tomás Boves (1782–1814), Venezuelan warlord

See also
 Bove, a surname (including a list of people with the name)
 Bové, a surname (including a list of people with the name)